Gnathophausia ingens, the giant red mysid, is a species of lophogastrid crustacean with a pantropical distribution. Females may brood their young for up to 530 days. They do not feed during this time. When they feed, they prey on smaller crustaceans.

References

External links

Image of Gnathophausia ingens at the Monterey Bay Aquarium Research Institute

Malacostraca
Crustaceans described in 1870
Pantropical fauna